Llywelyn ap Merfyn (died 942) was an early 10th-century King of Powys, son of Merfyn ap Rhodri, and grandson of Rhodri the Great.

942 deaths
Monarchs of Powys
10th-century Welsh monarchs
House of Aberffraw
Year of birth unknown